Varna is a rural locality (a selo) and the administrative center of Varnensky District, Chelyabinsk Oblast, Russia. Population: 

The name of the locality refers to the Russo-Turkish War and the capture of the fortress of Varna by Russians in 1828.

References

Notes

Sources

Rural localities in Chelyabinsk Oblast